Major-General William Michael Ellis Hicks  (2 June 1928 – 27 December 2008) was a British Army officer.

Military career
Educated at Eton College and the Royal Military Academy Sandhurst, Hicks was commissioned into the Coldstream Guards in 1948. He became commanding officer of 1st Battalion the Coldstream Guards in 1970 and was deployed to Northern Ireland during the Troubles. He went on to be commander of the 4th Guards Armoured Brigade in Münster in 1974, Brigadier on the General Staff at UK Land Forces in 1976 and General Officer Commanding North West District in 1980 before retiring in 1983.

He was appointed a Companion of the Order of the Bath in the 1982 Birthday Honours.

In 1950 he married Jean Hilary Duncan; they had three sons. He died on 27 December 2008.

References

 

1928 births
2008 deaths
British military personnel of The Troubles (Northern Ireland)
Military personnel from Buckinghamshire
People educated at Eton College
Graduates of the Royal Military Academy Sandhurst
British Army major generals
Coldstream Guards officers
Companions of the Order of the Bath
Commanders of the Order of the British Empire